The Lola B2K/00 is an open-wheel racing car chassis, designed and built by Lola Cars that competed in the CART open-wheel racing series, for competition in the 2000 season.

References 

Lola racing cars
Open wheel racing cars
American Championship racing cars